is a classical trans-Neptunian object and possible dwarf planet of the Kuiper belt in the outermost region of the Solar System, approximately 450 kilometers in diameter. It was discovered on 13 July 2004, by astronomers at Palomar Observatory, California, United States.

Orbit and classification 

 is a "cubewano", a classical, low-eccentricity object in the Kuiper belt, that orbits the Sun at a distance of 36.8–50.0 AU once every 286 years and 2 months (104,527 days). Its orbit has an eccentricity of 0.15 and an inclination of 31° with respect to the ecliptic. It is currently 39 AU from the Sun.

A first precovery was taken at the Siding Spring Observatory in 1982, extending the body's observation arc by 22 years prior to its official discovery observation at Palomar.

Physical characteristics

Rotation period 

The ambiguous lightcurve gave a rotation period of 7.87 hours with a low brightness amplitude of 0.04 magnitude.

Diameter and albedo 

According to the "TNOs are Cool" survey, using observations from the space-based Herschel and Spitzer telescopes,  measures 423 kilometers in diameter and its surface has a visual geometric albedo of 0.125, while the Collaborative Asteroid Lightcurve Link assumes an albedo of 0.10 and calculates a diameter of 482.53 kilometers with on an absolute magnitude of 4.7.

Naming 

As of 2017, this minor planet remains unnamed.

References

External links 
 Asteroid Lightcurve Database (LCDB), query form (info )
 Dictionary of Minor Planet Names, Google books
 Asteroids and comets rotation curves, CdR – Observatoire de Genève, Raoul Behrend
 Discovery Circumstances: Numbered Minor Planets (440001)-(445000) – Minor Planet Center
 

Classical Kuiper belt objects
Discoveries by the Palomar Observatory
Possible dwarf planets
20040713